The fishing industry in England covers the fish processing industry and fishing trawler companies that fish around England.

Geographical spread of ports
Important English seafishing ports include:
 Brixham
 Fleetwood – home of the Fisherman's Friend
 Grimsby – once the largest fishing port in the world
 Lowestoft
 Newlyn
 Whitby
 Kingston upon Hull

History
The fishing industry in England was once much larger than it is today. As a response to declining stocks, the Common Fisheries Policy imposed quotas on the amount of catch permitted to be brought ashore. This prevented a collapse in the industry and cod has since been reclassified as sustainable.

In the context of the UK fishing industry

Updated statistics from the UK's Marine Management Organisation on the UK fishing sector show that UK vessels landed 724 thousand tonnes of sea fish in 2017, with a value of £980 million. Scottish vessels accounted for 64 per cent of the quantity of landings by the UK fleet while English vessels accounted for 28 per cent.

Fish processing
Fish processing companies are based in Grimsby (Young's Bluecrest), Whitby (Whitby Seafoods) and Lowestoft (Birds Eye).

Organisations

Regulation
The Marine Management Organisation implements the sea fisheries legislation in the UK.

Industry organisations
The National Fishing Heritage Centre in Grimsby displays how the fishing industry in England once was. Also in Grimsby is the Sea Fish Industry Authority (SeaFish) which promotes the consumption of fish, and conducts research for the fishing and fish-processing industry.

The Fishermen's Mission is a Christian charity supporting fishermen and their families within the UK.

See also
 Economy of England
 Fishing in Cornwall
 Scots Herring Lassies strike in East Anglia 1938
 Yorkshire coast fishery

References

External links
 UK fishing industry at National Statistics
 Fishing News

 
Food processing industry in the United Kingdom